Télémaque et Calypso (Telemachus and Calypso), also Télémaque or [French: ou] Calypso, is an opera by the French composer André Cardinal Destouches, first performed at the Académie Royale de Musique (the Paris Opera) on 29 November 1714. It takes the form of a tragédie en musique in a prologue and five acts. 

The libretto is by Simon-Joseph Pellegrin.  The plot is taken from Les Aventures de Télémaque by François Fénelon, itself adapted from Homer's Telemachy: Telemachus is shipwrecked while searching for his father Ulysses, and resists seduction by the sea-nymph Calypso because of his love for the shepherdess Eucharis. The opera was imitated by a number of other Italian and French versions, including  by Alessandro Scarlatti and Carlo Sigismondo Capece.

References

Sources
  Libretto at "Livres baroques"
  Félix Clément and Pierre Larousse Dictionnaire des Opéras, Paris, 1881

French-language operas
Tragédies en musique
1714 operas
Operas by André Cardinal Destouches
Operas
Operas based on the Odyssey
Works based on Les Aventures de Télémaque